Amy O'Neill is an American former actress. After appearing in several sitcoms and starring as Molly Stark on The Young and the Restless in 1986, she was cast in her notable role as Amy Szalinski in the 1989 Disney film, Honey, I Shrunk the Kids, for which she was nominated for a Young Artist Award. She reprised her role as Amy Szalinski in the 1992 sequel, Honey, I Blew Up the Kid and appeared as Lisa Barnes in Where's Rodney?

Early life
O'Neill was born in Pacific Palisades, California, the daughter of Virginia, an art school director, and Thomas O'Neill, a Los Angeles construction company owner. She is the third of five children. Her older siblings are brother Casey and sister Katie. Her younger brothers are Hugh and Barry. Her father is the brother of Hugh O'Neill, Esq, former Deputy Chief Counsel to The Secretary of the Navy, John Lehman. O'Neill is of Irish heritage.

Career
O'Neill began auditioning for parts at age ten with her older siblings. After school, the kids would drive out to Hollywood. O'Neill made her first appearance on television at age 13 in an episode of Mama's Family as a younger version of Betty White's character, Ellen Harper. She continued working on television shows such as Matt Houston, Night Court, Highway to Heaven and The Twilight Zone. She also appeared on the American game show, Body Language in the summer of 1985. After an appearance on Family Ties, O'Neill won the role of the pregnant teenager Molly Stark on the daytime soap, The Young and the Restless for thirty episodes in 1986.

She appeared in the 1989 television films, Desperate for Love as Tammy Lauren's best friend, with Christian Slater and as Jodie in I Know My First Name is Steven, before appearing in her most recognized role as Amy Szalinski in Honey, I Shrunk the Kids. In the film, she and her brother are shrunk to 1/4 inch high by the father's (Rick Moranis) shrink ray. 

O'Neill continued work as Annette in an episode of Star Trek: The Next Generation, but most of her scenes were cut out due to time constraints. She can, however, be seen in the background of a crowd scene. She acted as Lisa Barnes in the pilot episode of Where's Rodney? with Honey co-star Jared Rushton and Rodney Dangerfield, but it wasn't picked up in 1990 or 1991. She continued working in television series such as Room for Romance, The Young Riders, and Gabriel's Fire, and starred as Susan Hartley in an episode of Murder, She Wrote.

She reprised the role of Amy Szalinski in the 1992 film Honey, I Blew Up the Kid, albeit only in the opening scene where she leaves for college. The reason for this is that the film was originally a standalone story unrelated to Honey, I Shrunk the Kids, and when the plot was changed to include the Szalinski family, there was no parallel character for O'Neill to replace. Amy Szalinski is also mentioned but does not appear in the third film, Honey, We Shrunk Ourselves.

O'Neill later appeared in the television film, White Wolves: A Cry in the Wild II as Pandra, one of the young adults stuck in the Cascade Mountains, having to fend for themselves. In 1994, she appeared in the National Lampoon film, Attack of the 5 Ft. 2 In. Women as a German Skater.

Personal life
After her interest in acting had waned, O'Neill quit acting in 1994 after getting scripts that required nudity. She met old childhood friend, Roy Johns, owner of a few circus acts. As she watched his work, she became interested in how active the girls in his performances were. She became involved with his acts and is now part of Johns' crew.

She is now part of the performance art community in Los Angeles. In 2002, she joined the Hollywood, Alabama trio, "Girls On Stilts." She has toured places in Italy and Asia, and has brandished her skills at Harrah's Casino, Disneyland, and other places. She doesn't have any children and is not currently married, but hoping to start a family with someone who isn't "intimidated" by her work as a performer.

O'Neill returned to television in 2005 to appear in an MTV documentary with her Honey, I Shrunk the Kids co-star Thomas Wilson Brown in The 100 Greatest Family Films. In 2008, she appeared as an Officer's wife in an independent film, The Japanese Sandman.

Filmography

Films

Television

References

External links

Amy O'Neill official page on Myspace

20th-century American actresses
American film actresses
American soap opera actresses
American television actresses
Living people
Actresses from Los Angeles
People from Pacific Palisades, California
21st-century American women
Year of birth missing (living people)